Chaiyapol Julien Poupart  (born February 27, 1990), is a Thai model and actor.

Early life and education 
Poupart was born in Bangkok to a Thai Belgian father and a Thai Chinese mother. He is the nephew of Michael Poupart and Oliver Poupart and is a cousin to Suradet Piniwat. Poupart graduated from primary school from Demonstration School, Srinakharinwirot University, Prasanmit (Primary School), secondary school from Patumwan Demonstration School, Srinakharinwirot University and a bachelor's degree from the Faculty of Sport Science, Chulalongkorn University, in Recreation and Sports Management (2nd class honors) as a budding fellow with Theeradej Methawarayuth.

Career 
His debut in the entertainment industry is through advertising from companies like KFC and DTAC. His role as an actor started from the drama called Kaew Lompetch, which is considered to be the birth of many new actors.

In 2011, Poupart was given the opportunity to play the role in his first film from ML Phan Thuanphetawakun, Pha Muang Tunnel. The following year was again approached by ML Phan Thuanphetawakun and the role of "Ken Krating-thong", a famous character in Thai erotic novels, which later were used to make the movie, Jan Dara the Beginning. The movie increased Poupart's reputation through his ability to play a variety of love scenes and has made the name of Poupart well-known.

Filmography

Film

Television series

Mc 
 2016 Sports inspired by Supersports: Monday-Friday at 1.45 pm Broadcasting ONE 31 
 2017–Present  The First Ultimate   Broadcasting PPTV

Music Videos 
 The song falls in love with Wai Kamikaze
 Music for permission ... Concern of Dome The Star
 Songs Bangkok Allergy (feat. Takhakan Chlada) of Pang Nakarin
 The music of Ying Lee Si Chumphon

Awards 
 Award for Best Supporting Actor, Karp Chad Luek Award, the 10th time from the drama "Buongrak"
 Silver Doll Award Outstanding young actor The 29th Phra Surasawadee Royal Award from the movie Jan Dara the Beginning for the year 2012

References

Citations

General references

External links 

1990 births
Living people
Chaiyapol Julien Poupart
Chaiyapol Julien Poupart
Chaiyapol Julien Poupart
Chaiyapol Julien Poupart
Chaiyapol Julien Poupart
Chaiyapol Julien Poupart
Chaiyapol Julien Poupart
Chaiyapol Julien Poupart
Chaiyapol Julien Poupart